The following are the national records in athletics in San Marino maintained by its national athletics federation: Federazione Sammarinese Atletica Leggera (FSAL).

Outdoor
Key to tables:

h = hand timing

Men

Women

Indoor

Men

Women

Notes

References
General
Sanmarinese Athletics Records 17 June 2022 updated
Specific

External links
FSAL web site

San Marino
Records
Athletics